Heligoland is a German island in the North Sea.

Heligoland or Helgoland may also refer to:

Books
 Helgoland (book), a 2020 popular book by the physicist Carlo Rovelli
 Heligoland (novel), a 2003 novel by Shena Mackay

Music
 Heligoland (band), a five-piece independent band from Melbourne, Australia
 Heligoland (album), a 2010 album by British trip-hop band Massive Attack
 Helgoland (Bruckner), a work for male chorus and orchestra by Anton Bruckner
 Tim Friese-Greene or Heligoland, musician and producer

Ships
 KMD Helgoland, a Danish ironclad.
 MV Helgoland, used as a hospital ship in the Vietnam War from 1966 to 1971
 , a Dreadnought-type battleship of the Kaiserliche Marine launched in 1909
 , a class of German dreadnought battleships
 , an Austro-Hungarian cruiser that sank the Monge captained by Roland Morillot
 , a whaler requisitioned by the Kriegsmarine during the Second World War

Other uses
 Heligoland Bight, a bay forming part of the German Bight in the North Sea
 'Helgoland' underwater laboratory (UWL) is an underwater habitat.
 Heligoland trap, for trapping wild birds
 Heligoland–Zanzibar Treaty
Lager Helgoland, a Nazi Germany-era labour camp on Alderney.